Faculty or faculties may refer to:

Academia 
 Faculty (academic staff), the lecturers of a given university (North American usage)
 Faculty (division), a large department of a university by field of study (used outside North America)

Biology 
 An ability of an individual
 Cognitive skills, colloquially faculties
 Senses or perceptive faculties—such as sight, hearing or touch

Business 
 Faculty (company), a British tech firm (formerly ASI)

Film and television 
 The Faculty, a 1998 horror/sci-fi movie by Robert Rodriguez
 The Faculty (TV series), a 1996 American sitcom

Religious law 
 Faculty (canon law), a judicial instrument or warrant in Christian canon law
 A priest's right to perform Christian liturgies